The Racetrack Playa, or The Racetrack, is a scenic dry lake feature with "sailing stones" that inscribe linear "racetrack" imprints. It is located above the northwestern side of Death Valley, in Death Valley National Park, Inyo County, California, U.S.A.

Geography
The playa is exceptionally flat and level with the northern end being only  higher than the southern. This occurrence is due to major influx of fine-grained sediment that accumulates at the north end.

The playa is in the small Racetrack Valley endorheic basin between the Cottonwood Mountains on the east and Nelson Range to the west. During periods of heavy rain, water washes down from the surrounding mountains draining into the playa, forming a shallow, short-lived endorheic lake. Under the hot desert sun, the thin veneer of water quickly evaporates leaving behind a surface layer of soft slick mud.  As the mud dries, it shrinks and cracks into a mosaic pattern of interlocking polygons.

The shape of  the shallow hydrocarbon lake Ontario Lacus on Saturn's moon Titan has been compared to that of Racetrack Playa.

Features

The Racetrack 
Racetrack is dry for almost the entire year and has no vegetation.  When dry, its surface is covered with small but firm hexagonal mud crack polygons that are typically 3 to 4 inches (7.5 to 10 cm) in diameter and about an inch (2.5 cm) thick.  The polygons form in sets of three mud cracks at 120° to each other.  A few days after a precipitation event, small mud curls, otherwise known as "corn flakes" form on the playa surface.  Absence of these indicates that wind or another object has scraped away the tiny mud curls.

During the bimodal rainy season (summer and especially winter) a shallow cover of water deposits a thin layer of fine mud on and between the polygons of Racetrack. Heavier winter precipitation temporarily erases them until spring when the dry conditions cause new mud cracks to form in the place of the old cracks. Sandblasting wind continually helps to round the edges of exposed polygons.  Annual precipitation is 3 to 4 inches (75 to 100 mm) and ice cover can be 1 to 2.5 inches (2.5 to 6.5 cm) thick. Typically only part of the playa will flood in any given year.

The Racetrack was vandalised in late 2016.

Sailing stones 

The sailing stones are a geological phenomenon found in the Racetrack.  Slabs of dolomite and syenite ranging from a few hundred grams (few ounces) to hundreds of kilograms (pounds) inscribe visible tracks as they slide across the playa surface, without human or animal intervention.  Instead, rocks move when ice sheets just a few millimeters thick  start to melt during periods of light wind. These thin floating ice panels create an ice shove that moves the rocks at up to five meters (16') per minute.

The 2017 documentary Principles of Curiosity explores as its central theme the story of how the sailing stones' movement had been a mystery which came to be solved using the scientific method and critical thinking.

Islands 

Two islands of bedrock outcrops rise dramatically above the playa's surface at its northern end. The second 'island' feature is a smaller carbonate outcrop.

Springs 

There are three areas of aligned depressions (intermittent springs) in the playa. 

Spinal Springs is in the central part of the Racetrack playa. It is 550 metres (600 yards) long and starts, at its northern end, with conical depressions only a few centimeters (inches) deep. Traced southward the depressions increase to ~5 metres (16') in width with scattered creosote shrubs. They then narrow and become shallower again, and finally disappear. Further north and south along this linear formation, there were several other depressions that may be a continuation of the Spinal Springs alignment.

Edge Springs is an alignment of the depressions along the southeastern edge of the Racetrack playa. The alignment parallels the toes of alluvial fans along the base of the steep mountain range.

Gindarja Springs is an alignment of depressions that consists of three large indentations aligned in a northwesterly direction within the Racetrack playa. Two are completely within the playa and the third is on the edge. All three are associated with significant vegetation.

Visiting
Access is via Racetrack Road, reached at the Grapevine Junction near Scotty's Castle. The 28 mile rough gravel road heading south-west from Ubehebe Crater is passable with non-4WD vehicles but requires high ground clearance. It rounds the western side of the playa to a parking area with descriptive signs by the National Park Service.  A bench here, placed by the Mano Seca Group, has scenic views of The Racetrack, The Grandstand, and mountain scenery.
Another access to Racetrack Playa is Lippincott pass road that enters the Racetrack valley from the south west, climbing up from Saline Valley. Lippincott Pass and the roads in Saline Valley are extremely rough and negotiable for high clearance 4WD vehicles with all-terrain tires only.

Camping, while not allowed on the playa, is available in "primitive campsite" areas to the north and south.
Visiting remote areas of Death Valley National Park bears considerable risk. Summer temperatures can surpass  in certain spots, large areas are without cellphone reception, roads are treacherous and the closest gas station is in Panamint Springs.

See also

 Geology of the Death Valley area
 Places of interest in the Death Valley area

References

External links

 
 Video of the Living Stones of Death Valley
 USGS: Racetrack Playa
 Las piedras que se mueven solas valle de la muerte ( Español )
 The Sliding Rocks of Racetrack Playa
 The Mystery of the Rocks on the Racetrack at Death Valley
 Differential GPS/GIS analysis of the sliding rock phenomenon of Racetrack Playa, Death Valley National Park
 Rocks in Motion
 Principles of Curiosity

Death Valley
Death Valley National Park
Salt flats of California
Endorheic basins of the United States
Landforms of Inyo County, California
Natural history of the Mojave Desert